R. darwini may refer to:

Risius darwini
Ropalidia darwini

See also 
 R. darwinii (disambiguation)
 Darwini (disambiguation)